Haneen Zoabi (born 23 May 1969), is a Palestinian-Israeli politician. The first Arab woman to be elected to the legislature on an Arab party's list, she served as a member of the Knesset for the Balad party between 2009 and 2019. In 2021, she was convicted of forgery and fraud after pleading guilty.

Biography
Haneen Zoabi was born in Nazareth to a Muslim family. Zoabi studied philosophy and psychology at the University of Haifa, earning a Bachelor of Arts, and received a Master of Arts in communications from the Hebrew University of Jerusalem. She was the first Arab citizen of Israel to graduate in media studies, and established the first media classes in Arab schools. She also worked as a mathematics teacher and worked as a school inspector for the Israeli Ministry of Education.

She is a relative of Seif el-Din el-Zoubi, a former mayor of Nazareth and member of the Knesset between 1949 and 1959, and again from 1965 until 1979, and Abd el-Aziz el-Zoubi, a Deputy Health Minister and the first Arab member of an Israeli government.

Political career
Zoabi joined Balad in 2001. In 2003, she co-founded the NGO I'lam – Media Center for Arab Palestinians in Israel (pronounced e'e'lam). Zoabi was its general director until she resigned shortly before the 2009 election to focus on her political career. She ran for Knesset as a Balad candidate in 2006, but was too low on the party's electoral list to win a seat. However, prior to the 2009 elections she was placed third on the Balad list, and entered the Knesset after the party won three seats, becoming the first female Arab MK to represent an Arab party (the two previous female Arab MKs Hussniya Jabara and Nadia Hilou had represented Meretz and Labor).

During the build-up to the January 2013 elections, it was announced in December 2012 that the Central Elections Committee (CEC) and a panel of Supreme Court judges would hold discussions on whether to disqualify Zoabi, as well as the Balad and United Arab List parties, from the upcoming elections. The request for her disqualificationwas  submitted by MK Ofir Akunis (Likud) and had obtained the necessary number of signatures. It stated that "throughout her years in the Knesset, Zoabi has constantly undermined the State of Israel and has openly incited against the government, its institutions and IDF soldiers." The request also claimed that Zoabi negated Israel's existence as a Jewish and democratic state, which made her eligible for disqualification. Zoabi called the sponsors of the request fascists and said that "for whoever does not want citizens to have free elections, I am one of many targets ..." She added that only "dark regimes" are proud of disqualifying election candidates. After hearing the case, the Central Elections Committee disqualified Zoabi in a 19–9 vote. The Supreme Court overturned the disqualification, with the nine-judge panel headed by Supreme Court President Asher Grunis unanimously voting to overturn the ban. Zoabi was subsequently re-elected. Following the elections, Likud MK Danny Danon initiated a bill dubbed the "Zoabi Law" in February 2019. An amendment to the Basic Law dealing with legislation, it would make it harder for the Supreme Court to overturn a decision by the Central Elections Committee. The bill failed to pass.

Zoabi faced a similar situation prior to the March 2015 elections. On 12 February 2015, the CEC voted 27–6 to disqualify Zoabi from running in the elections. However, on 18 February the Supreme Court overturned the ruling in an 8–1 decision. She retired from national politics prior to the April 2019 elections, although she was given a symbolic 113th slot on the joint list of Balad and the United Arab List.

Political views and opinions
Zoabi views herself as a Palestinian. She considers the two-state solution unrealistic and describes as inherently racist the notion that Israel is a Jewish state. Instead she advocates a single state shared by Jews and Palestinian Arabs with full rights and equality for both national groups. She has said, "The reality of Israel's actions shows us that it's unrealistic to have a real sovereign state in the West Bank and Gaza with Jerusalem as the capital. The more realistic solution is one state with full national equality for both national groups."

Zoabi argues that rejection of the Jewish state concept is the only way to combat Avigdor Lieberman's demand that Israeli citizens take loyalty oaths. Rejecting the 'Jewish state' concept, she says, "is the only idea that can remove Lieberman from the circle of political and moral legitimacy... When you agree with the 'Jewish state' idea, you necessarily agree with the idea of loyalty to this state. Rejecting the 'Jewish state' concept will block the road for anyone who demands our loyalty to such a state." In 2009, she met with Code Pink, and Coalition of Women for Peace. But in 2016 in Switzerland Zoabi retracted this somewhat and said:

My vision is Justice and liberation. I don't want to formulate our position as Palestinians within the question of one state or two states. This is a procedural question for me... Even if we are talking about two states, none of them can be a Jewish state... both must be democratic. We cannot agree with the notion of a Jewish state. It's not a matter of one or two. It's a matter of justice and liberation. I think this is a terminology we must use....
Now! End occupation. Now! The right of return!... my party which I represent talks about two different states. One state for all citizens which is non-Zionist state, non-Jewish state, within the borders of '48. And a Palestinian state, with the right of return.... This is the program of my party.

She also believes that the West should engage with rather than boycott Hamas, which rules the Gaza Strip. She commented, "No one can tell the Palestinian people whom to choose as a government. Hamas is not a terrorist organization.... Regardless of whether I disagree [with Hamas], the international community cannot mediate neutrally if it starts to label the organizations of the Palestinians as illegitimate."

She has described soldiers of the Israel Defense Forces as "murderers."

Zoabi in 2009 described Lieberman, Tzipi Livni, and Benjamin Netanyahu as "a bunch of fascists pure and simple". She added, however, that [Netanyahu] is "much more dangerous" than Lieberman, because he "shares Lieberman's fascist views but takes care to sugarcoat his message for the international media".

At the 18th Knesset swearing-in ceremony on 24 February 2009, she left the Knesset plenum before the singing of Hatikva, Israel's national anthem. "'Hatikva' doesn't represent me", she later said. "I preferred to leave the room, because I don't appreciate hypocrisy."

Zoabi and the Balad party reject any form of national service for Israel's Arab citizens.

Views on Iran 
The Jerusalem Post reported in March 2009 that Zoabi said that she was not concerned that Iran might acquire nuclear weapons. Instead she suggested that the Middle East needed a counterweight to Israel's nuclear weaponry. She explained, "I am afraid of real risk rather than of potential risk." An Iranian nuclear weapon, she said, is only a potential threat. "The real danger is the IDF.... It is more dangerous to the world, more dangerous to everyone, more dangerous to the Palestinians, to Israelis, to have Israel as the only powerful state.... The violence of the Israeli army is an outcome of Israel's convenient feeling that no one will restrict her." Zoabi also claimed that Iran was a positive influence on Palestinian affairs and had played a more beneficial role in region than Jordan or Egypt because it stood more firmly "against occupation than a lot of the Arab countries".

Balad's chairman at the time, Jamal Zahalka, said that Zoabi's comments represented an analysis rather than a party position, and did not constitute supporting a nuclear-armed Iran.

In an interview in 2010 in New Statesman she asked rhetorically, "If the world doesn't prevent Israel from having nuclear weapons, why does it prevent others?".

Participation in the Gaza flotilla
On 31 May 2010, Zoabi participated in the Gaza flotilla, and was on board the MV Mavi Marmara when violence broke out as Israeli commandos boarded the ship. Zoabi was arrested and briefly held by authorities. At a news conference upon her release, Zoabi called the raid criminal, saying she witnessed two wounded passengers bleed to death after the Israelis refused to provide requested medical aid. She also stated, "It was clear from the size of the force that boarded the ship that the purpose was not only to stop this sail, but to cause the largest possible number of fatalities in order to stop such initiatives in the future."

In a speech at the Knesset a day after her release, Zoabi called the raid a "pirate military operation" and asked for an international investigation. She also demanded to know why the Israeli government had not released photos and videos it confiscated from passengers that might shed light on why nine passengers were killed and dozens wounded. During her address she also said, "Israel spoke of a provocation, but there was no provocation. Why does the government of Israel oppose an investigation?"

Zoabi was repeatedly interrupted and shouted down during the speech by other lawmakers, one of whom shouted "Go to Gaza, traitor!" The chaos reached a peak when MK Anastasia Michaeli charged the podium in an attempt to prevent Zoabi from continuing. Zoabi received death threats after the speech, and two security guards were assigned for her protection. One man who offered a reward on Facebook of free groceries for killing Zoabi was arrested.

Zoabi commented three years after the events, "I came to the Knesset two days after the Marmara events, stunned by the way a political protest had become a bloodbath. I hoped that the MKs would want to hear firsthand testimony. I was ready to be questioned. But I was so naive. I encountered hate politics."

For her participation in the Gaza flotilla, Israel Interior Minister Eli Yishai requested that Attorney General Yehuda Weinstein revoke Zoabi's parliamentary immunity and authorize Yishai to strip Zoabi of Israeli citizenship. Yishai accused Zoabi of engaging in a "premeditated act of treason", claiming she had assisted activists on board the Mavi Marmara and was "undoubtedly aware" of their preparations to attack IDF soldiers. Likud MK Yariv Levin also accused Zoabi of betraying the State of Israel, and called for her prosecution.

A Knesset committee voted 7–1 to recommend her parliamentary immunity be revoked, which attracted concern from the international Inter-Parliamentary Union and was ultimately blocked by Knesset Speaker Reuven Rivlin, who ignored the recommendation and declined to submit it to a vote of the full Knesset. He and Prime Minister Benjamin Netanyahu hoped that sparing Zoabi would protect Israel from further international condemnation over its Gaza blockade and its military's actions aboard the Mavi Marmara. Rivlin, known for his advocacy of Arab–Jewish coexistence, said he was stunned by the assault on Zoabi's privileges as well as the near physical attack upon her. He asked, "Would they do that to a Jewish member?"

When the full Knesset met on 13 July 2010, it decided, in a 34–16 vote, to strip Zoabi of three parliamentary privileges as a penalty for her participation in the flotilla: the right to have a diplomatic passport, entitlement to financial assistance should she require legal help, and the right to visit countries with which Israel does not have diplomatic relations. She was also stripped of the right to participate in Knesset discussions and to vote in parliamentary committees. In 2011, Attorney General Yehuda Weinstein closed the case against Zoabi because of "significant evidentiary and legal difficulties."

Israeli foreign ministry tweets
Partly because of an Israeli embassy's tweets about Zoabi, in August 2012, the Foreign Ministry of Israel updated its social media guidelines for its worldwide diplomats, clarifying that for practical purposes there is no difference between a tweet or on-line social media post and an official briefing, as they will be interpreted as Israel's official position. This move followed several embarrassing incidents where inappropriate tweets or posts were made by Israeli embassies. One major embarrassment occurred when Zoabi made a speaking tour of Ireland. When she criticized Israel in some of her speeches, the Dublin-based Israeli embassy in Ireland responded with three tweets critical of her, in spite of the fact that she is an elected official.

2014 kidnapping comments and Knesset suspension
On 15 June 2014, five days after the kidnapping by Palestinians of three Israeli teenagers, Zoabi said, "Is it strange that people living under occupation and living impossible lives, in a situation where Israel kidnaps new prisoners every day, is it strange that they kidnap? They are not terrorists. Even if I do not agree with them, they are people who do not see any way to change their reality, and they are compelled to use means like these".

Many Israeli public figures criticized Zoabi's words. Labor opposition leader Isaac Herzog said they "were harmful to peace and the coexistence of Jews and Arabs in Israel as well as to the families who are hopefully awaiting news regarding their missing loved ones." Foreign Minister Avigdor Liberman said that "not only are the kidnappers terrorists, Hanin Zoabi is a terrorist too." Echoing comments by other Israeli politicians, Knesset Interior Committee chairwoman Miri Regev said, "Hanin Zoabi is a traitor and should be deported to Gaza."

Zoabi reported receiving hundreds of death threats in the first days after her comments. She commented, "I was taken by surprise at the public's reaction. I was surprised since the injustice inflicted on the other side is so much greater. There are thousands of abducted Palestinians in Israeli prisons.... It's not that I want Israelis to be abducted and not released. The exact opposite is the case."

On 25 July Israeli attorney general Yehuda Weinstein ordered an investigation of Zoabi on charges of incitement and public disgrace. On July 29, Zoabi was suspended from the Knesset plenum for a duration of six months. During that time she was not allowed to address the Knesset or its committees. Zoabi's appeal to Israel's Supreme Court to overturn the suspension was rejected.

Meeting with Palestinian attackers families
In February 2016, during the 2015–2016 wave of violence in Israeli-Palestinian conflict Zoabi and two other Arab Israeli MKs met with the families of Palestinian attackers. The purpose of the meeting was to secure the release of the attackers bodies for burial. For the participation in the meeting she and the two other Arab Israeli MKs were suspended from the Knesset for four months by the Knesset's Ethics Committee.

See also
 List of Arab members of the Knesset
 Women in Arab societies

References

External links

1969 births
Living people
Arab citizens of Israel
Politicians from Nazareth
University of Haifa alumni
Hebrew University of Jerusalem Faculty of Social Sciences alumni
Israeli educators
Israeli civil servants
Women members of the Knesset
Palestinian women in politics
Arab members of the Knesset
Balad (political party) politicians
Members of the 18th Knesset (2009–2013)
Members of the 19th Knesset (2013–2015)
Members of the 20th Knesset (2015–2019)
21st-century Israeli women politicians
Israeli Muslims
Israeli politicians convicted of fraud